Germain Berthé (born 24 October 1993) is a Malian professional footballer who most recently played as a goalkeeper for Real Bamako and the Mali national team.

Career
Berthé signed to Horoya AC in 2015, serving as the backup to veteran Khadim N'Diaye. When N'Diaye and Berthé both went down with injury in 2019, young reserve Moussa Camara took over the starting spot and Berthé was subsequently released in September 2020.

References

External links
 

1993 births
Living people
Association football goalkeepers
Malian footballers
Mali international footballers
Mali A' international footballers
Mali under-20 international footballers
2014 African Nations Championship players
2015 Africa Cup of Nations players
2015 Africa U-23 Cup of Nations players
Malian Première Division players
Guinée Championnat National players
AS Onze Créateurs de Niaréla players
Horoya AC players
AS Real Bamako players
Malian expatriate footballers
Malian expatriate sportspeople in Guinea
Expatriate footballers in Guinea
21st-century Malian people
2022 African Nations Championship players